Gore was a hundred of the historic county of Middlesex, England.

The hundred's name means 'piece of ground shaped like the head of a spear/triangle'.

Scope and importance

It covered an area in the north of the county, in present London Boroughs roughly that of Harrow, one third of Barnet (including Hendon and Edgware) and about a third of Brent, plus part of Elstree, historically divided between Hertfordshire and Middlesex. Per the relatively frequent central medieval records of all major estates including the Domesday Book, Feet of Fines (premiums on estates being transferred), Assize Rolls and subsidy rolls its parishes were:

By the end of the 15th century (due to subinfeudation) some 22 manors were in the Hundred.  From an early date the jurisdiction exercised by the hundred was minuscule. Only Great Stanmore of the manors did not at some times before 1300 enjoy or claim exemption from the Hundred Court. Free and frank rights instead include two known sets of franchies: those of Westminster Abbey and the Archbishop of Canterbury, and view of frankpledge and other liberties to the noble owner of Edgware and to St Bart's (the Great) Priory, Smithfield, London who acquired Little Stanmore.

See also
HA postcode area and to a lesser extent NW postcode area; most of the HA post towns and numbered divisions are based on the old parishes but reshaped for post service convenience.

References

Hundreds and divisions of Middlesex
History of local government in London (pre-1855)
History of the London Borough of Barnet
History of the London Borough of Brent
History of the London Borough of Harrow